The Carpet America Recovery Effort or CARE is a joint industry-government non-profit organization whose mission is to develop market-based solutions for recovering value from discarded carpet. CARE was established on January 8, 2002 and their initial goals included a 10-year plan to increase the recycling and reuse of post-use carpet materials. CARE is led by voluntary partnerships and funded by its industry members. The CARE reclamation network consists of CARE facilities around the United States that collect used carpet. Since its start in 2002, CARE has expanded its reclamation network from 5 to 58, and its members have diverted over one billion pounds of post-consumer carpet from landfills. In 2012, CARE issued a report detailing the progress made towards these goals. Those involved in the carpet industry can become a CARE member by paying annual dues.

References

External links

Carpet America Recovery Effort at LinkedIn

Recycling organizations
Recycling in the United States
Environmental mitigation